Nichita is a Romanian-language masculine given name and surname. Notable persons with that name include:

Nichita Danilov (born 1952), Romanian poet
Nichita Iurașco (born 1999), Moldovan footballer
Nichita Moțpan (born 2001), Moldovan footballer
Nichita Smochină (1894–1980), Russian-Romanian activist, scholar and political figure
Nichita Stănescu (1933–1983), Romanian poet and essayist

Surname
Gheorghe Nichita (born 1956), Romanian politician
Mirela Nichita-Paşca (born 1985), Romanian handballer

See also

Nechita
Nikita (given name)

Romanian-language surnames
Romanian masculine given names